Rebecca Chalker (born 1943) is a health writer and women's rights activist who is the author of several books on women's health issues.

Early life and education
Chalker completed a BA in 1966 and an MA in 1975 from Florida State University, Tallahassee. She served in the Peace Corps from 1966 to 1967 as a teacher in Iran at the Tehran School of Social Work.

Chalker was a vocal critic of United States policy towards Iran, and in 1979 she was arrested along with other activists for hanging a "U.S. Imperialism Get Your Bloody Hands Off Iran" banner on the Washington Monument. She traveled to Tehran as a member of the "Send the Shah Back—Hands Off Iran Delegation" in support of the Iranian Revolution and the occupation of the United States embassy in Iran. After her return to the United States, she and  Eileen Schnitger (a fellow member of the Feminist Women's Health Center) disrupted the Women's National Powerlifting Championships while wearing "Send the Shah Back" t-shirts.

Writing career

Chalker's books include The Complete Cervical Cap Guide, Overcoming Bladder Disorders, and A Women's Book of Choices: Abortion, Menstrual Extraction, RU-486. She has also written The Clitoral Truth, about genital anatomy and ways to enhance sexual responses.

In 1993, Le Anne Schreiber writes in The New York Times about A Woman's Book of Choices, that "there is one incontrovertible fact of abortion in America: for more than a century, American women's access to safe abortions has been controlled by doctors and legislators. In defiance of that pattern, Rebecca Chalker, an abortion counselor and the author of a number of popular medical books, and Carol Downer, a lawyer and the executive director of the Federation of Feminist Women's Health Centers, have issued a declaration of independence."

Chalker is a professor at Pace University in New York City and continues to lecture on women's health and sexuality issues.

Works

Books

 (2nd edition published 2018)

Notes

References

American health and wellness writers
American women non-fiction writers
Living people
1943 births
Florida State University alumni
Pace University faculty
20th-century American women writers
Peace Corps volunteers
American anti-war activists
American women academics
21st-century American women